Euthyone tincta is a moth of the subfamily Arctiinae first described by George Hampson in 1900. It is found in Bolivia.

References

Lithosiini